Anarchism in Uruguay held a major importance in the organization of the labor movement. The history of the libertarian movement in Uruguay was closely linked to issues circulating internationally: the immigration of Spanish and Italian workers in particular had a major influence in its development, but the relations between revolutionary movements across Latin America, and in particular with Argentina and Brazil were equally significant.

History
In 1875, the "Regional Federation of the Eastern Republic of Uruguay" was founded in Montevideo on the initiative of French and Spanish revolutionaries, exiled following the destruction of the Paris Commune and the Cantonal Revolution respectively. Influenced by Mikhail Bakunin, the Federation of Montevideo officially joined the Anti-authoritarian International at the first session of the Congress of Verviers in September 1877, although it had already participated in a correspondence with the International for more than a year.

In the first years of the 20th century, the Uruguayan proletariat strengthened its organization by founding the country's first trade unions. This movement led, in 1905, to the founding of the Uruguayan Regional Workers' Federation (FORU), based on the anarcho-syndicalist model of the FORA.

In the 1950s a mixed community was established, Comunidad del Sur, made up of anarchists and anabaptist Christians.

Bibliography

See also
Plenario Intersindical de Trabajadores – Convención Nacional de Trabajadores
Luce Fabbri
Uruguayan Anarchist Federation

References

 
Uruguay
History of anarchism
History of Uruguay
Anarchism